Alexander Roger Wallace "Sasha" Frere-Jones (né Jones; born 1967) is an American writer, music critic, and musician. He has written for Pretty Decorating, ego trip, Hit It And Quit It, Mean, Slant, The New York Post, The Wire, The Village Voice, Slate, Spin, and The New York Times. He was on the staff of The New Yorker from 2004 to 2015. In January 2015, he left The New Yorker to work for Genius as an executive editor. Frere-Jones left Genius after several months to become critic-at-large at The Los Angeles Times. 

After less than a year he was forced to leave The Los Angeles Times under a cloud of scandal due to allegations that he expensed $5,000.00 at a strip club.

Personal life
He was born Alexander Roger Wallace Jones on January 31, 1967, in Manhattan, the elder child of Elizabeth Frere and Robin C. Jones. His younger brother, Tobias Frere-Jones, is founder of the typeface design company Frere-Jones Typography, and is on the faculty of the Yale School of Art. Tobias and Alexander both legally changed their surnames from Jones to Frere-Jones in 1981.

He is a grandson of Alexander Stuart Frere, the former chairman of the board of William Heinemann Ltd, the British publishing house, and a great-grandson of the novelist Edgar Wallace, who wrote many popular pulp novels, though he is best known for writing the story for the film King Kong. (Merian C. Cooper wrote the screenplay.)

In 1983, Frere-Jones played Capulet in a St. Ann's production of Romeo and Juliet directed by Nancy Fales Garrett. Mia Sara played Juliet. In 1984, Frere-Jones's We Three Kings was one of ten plays chosen for the Young Playwrights Festival.  The original reading starred John Pankow and Željko Ivanek. The final production at the Public Theater starred Adam Klugman, Jack Klugman's son. His follow-up play, Jump Down Turn Around, was performed at St. Ann's and starred Frere-Jones and actor Josh Hamilton.

In 1994, he married lawyer Deborah Holmes, with whom he has two sons. They divorced in 2006.

Education
Frere-Jones attended the Saint Ann's School in Brooklyn from 1972 to 1984. He won an award from the Young Playwrights Festival in 1983 for his play “We Three Kings.” After graduating from St. Ann's in 1984, Frere-Jones attended Brown University for three years but did not graduate. He subsequently attended the Tisch School of the Arts at NYU, concentrating on Dramatic Writing, then transferred to Columbia University in 1991. He graduated from the Columbia School of General Studies with a Bachelor of Arts degree in Sociology in 1993.

Music
Frere-Jones plays bass, guitar, and various electronics. He founded the band Dolores during his time at Brown. The band made two full-length tapes: one in 1987 and one in 1990. After moving to New York in 1988, the band played for two years before breaking up. (Their only recordings during this period were two contributions to a compilation on Fang Records called Live At The Knitting Factory.) In 1990, Frere-Jones co-founded the instrumental, two-bass rhythm band Ui with Clem Waldmann. They played their first live show in 1991, and spent the following eight years touring across the United States and Europe, opening for bands like Stereolab and Tortoise.

Career
Frere-Jones debuted as The New Yorker'''s pop critic on March 8, 2004 with "Let's Go Swimming", an essay on Arthur Russell. He followed in the footsteps of the magazine's past critics Ellen Willis, Mark Moses, Elizabeth Wurtzel, and Nick Hornby. He has covered independent acts like Arcade Fire, Joanna Newsom, Grizzly Bear, Manu Chao, and Bon Iver, as well as mainstream successes like Neil Diamond, Mariah Carey, Wu-Tang Clan, Lil Wayne, and Prince. Three essays originally published in the magazine have appeared in Da Capo Press's Best Music Writing anthologies.

On October 22, 2007, The New Yorker published “A Paler Shade of White", an essay in which Frere-Jones examined the changing role of race in pop, specifically indie rock and hip-hop of the last two decades. In the piece Frere-Jones charges indie with being too white and therefore not sounding black enough and hip hop for being too black. The piece was criticized by numerous pop music critics for Frere-Jones's seeming lack of knowledge regarding pop and rock music history, and controversial understanding of race in relation to music. It elicited responses from Playboy, The Village Voice, Slate, and Simon Reynolds, among dozens of other news outlets and blogs. The Stereogum music blog declared the controversy a 'war' between music writers. The New Yorker received more mail about "A Paler Shade of White" than it did for any other essay since "Escaping Picasso", Adam Gopnik's December 16, 1996 essay about Pablo Picasso. Frere-Jones published follow-ups to his article to address some of the criticism, including defending his description of Hall & Oates as "equally talented" as Michael Jackson (though he admitted his wording had been "slightly mischievous").

In 2008, Frere-Jones was named one of the top 30 critics in the world by Intelligent Life, the lifestyle publication from The Economist.

Frere-Jones appears in the 2009 documentary Strange Powers by Kerthy Fix and Gail O'Hara, about Stephin Merritt and his band, The Magnetic Fields, in which he further discusses his ideas of race in pop music.

On March 9, 2009, The New Yorker published his first profile, of British pop singer Lily Allen.

At the end of 2009, he helped bring mainstream attention to then-unsigned indie rock band Sleigh Bells when he wrote that, "After shows at Le Poisson Rouge and Public Assembly, I knew they were my favorite band in New York."

In a 2009 “Ask the Author” feature on The New Yorker's Web site, Frere-Jones revealed he was working on a collection of pieces that would include an extended version of “Paler” that would expound upon his thesis and address responses to the original piece. He also worked on a planned short book, Pop Is King: On Michael Jackson and Pop Music, which was due for publication in 2010 by Ecco Press, but it was never released.

Frere-Jones published his final column for The New Yorker on January 15, 2015. He left the magazine to work for the media annotation website Genius.com to work as an executive editor. 

He stayed there for several months, before moving to the Los Angeles Times'', where he was forced to leave after less than a year due to allegations that he expensed $5,000.00 at a strip club. "Sasha Frere-Jones has abruptly exited the L.A. Times after less than a year amid allegations of expense-account shenanigans involving a strip club and accepting expensive freebies from sources."

Bibliography

References

1967 births
Living people
American music critics
American music journalists
The New Yorker people
The New Yorker staff writers
The New Yorker critics
The Wire (magazine) writers
Tisch School of the Arts alumni
Brown University alumni
Columbia University School of General Studies alumni
Saint Ann's School (Brooklyn) alumni
Dustdevils members
Sasha
American people of English descent